Siege of Roses or Siege of Rosas may refer to:
 Siege of Roses (1645), the French captured the port from Spain during the Franco-Spanish War (1635-1659) 
 Siege of Roses (1693), the French quickly seized the city from the Spanish in the Nine Years' War
 Siege of Roses (1719), occurred during the War of the Quadruple Alliance 
 Siege of Roses (1794-1795), the French captured the city from Spain during the War of the Pyrenees
 Siege of Roses (1808), the French took the port from the Spanish in the Peninsular War